Lubków may refer to the following places in Poland:
Lubków, Bolesławiec County in Lower Silesian Voivodeship (south-west Poland)
Lubków, Lubin County in Lower Silesian Voivodeship (south-west Poland)
Lubków, West Pomeranian Voivodeship (north-west Poland)